Brian Tucker is a seismologist.

Brian or Bryan Tucker may also refer to:

Brian Tucker (executive), golf developer and executive
Brian Tucker (screenwriter), American film screenwriter
Brian Tucker (writer), Canadian writer
Bryan Tucker, Saturday Night Live writer